The Xiguan Mosque, is a mosque in Chengguan District, Lanzhou City, Gansu Province, China.

History
The mosque was originally built during the Wanli Emperor of the Ming dynasty. During the Qing dynasty, the mosque underwent two big reconstructions. The mosque was rebuilt in 1990 into what it is today with the added dome.

Architecture

The style of the mosque follows the Arabic Islamic style, while the prayer hall combines the Chinese classical and Arabic architectural style. The mosque covers an area of 467 m2 with its prayer hall spans over 141 m2.

See also
 Islam in China
 List of mosques in China

References

Mosques in Gansu
Mosques completed in 1990